The 1957 Bucknell Bison football team was an American football team that represented Bucknell University as an independent during the 1957 NCAA College Division football season. 

In its 12th season under head coach Harry Lawrence, the team compiled a 3–6 record. Bob Fitzsimmons and Rogers Frassenei were the team captains.

The team played its home games at Memorial Stadium on the university campus in Lewisburg, Pennsylvania.

Schedule

References

Bucknell
Bucknell Bison football seasons
Bucknell Bison football